Marno Redelinghuys (born ) is a South African rugby union player for the  in Super Rugby and  in the Currie Cup and the Rugby Challenge. His regular position is flank. He also plays for Rugby ATL of Major League Rugby (MLR).

He moved to Cape Town in 2018 to join .

References

South African rugby union players
Living people
1993 births
People from Klerksdorp
Rugby union flankers
Leopards (rugby union) players
Stormers players
Western Province (rugby union) players
Doping cases in rugby union
Rugby ATL players
Houston SaberCats players
Rugby union players from North West (South African province)